John Lindsay Stewart  (1831–1873) was a 19th-century Scottish botanist remembered for his conservation of Indian forests.

Life
Born in Fettercairn on 13 December 1831, he studied Medicine at Glasgow University under Prof George Arnott Walker-Arnott receiving his doctorate (MD) in 1853. He then sat the exam for the Indian Medical Service, passing, and going to Bengal in 1856 as an assistant surgeon. In 1857, he was present at the Siege of Delhi, one of the decisive points in the Indian Mutiny. 

In 1858, he joined the expedition to Yusufzai and served some time with the Punjab regiments. In 1860, he left his medical duties to become Superintendent of the Botanic Gardens at Saharunpore under the jurisdiction of Dr William Jameson, delegating for him during a year of absence. He had duties overseeing the government tea plantations in the region.

Following Jameson's return in 1861 he returned to medicine as a civilian surgeon in Bijnour. In 1864, he was put in charge of a programme of forest conservation in the Five Rivers region, continuing in this role for five years, and establishing systems echoed in many later conservation projects.

In 1872, he was elected a Fellow of the Royal Society of Edinburgh, his proposer being John Hutton Balfour.

He died on 7 July 1873 at the Hill Sanatorium in Dalhousie in India.

Publications

Punjab Plants

References

1831 births
1873 deaths
Scottish botanists
Alumni of the University of Glasgow
Fellows of the Royal Society of Edinburgh
Fellows of the Royal College of Surgeons